Vojislav Živanović, was a Serbian and Yugoslav Divisional General throughout the early 20th-century. He served in the First Balkan War, the Second Balkan War and World War I, known for commanding the Timočki Division and a recipient of the Order of Karađorđe's Star.

Early and education
Vojislav was born on January 26, 1870, at Kragujevac as the son of Mata Živanović who was a merchant hailing from Luznica. He spent a majority of his childhood in his father's village and attended elementary school there. He would finish the rest of his elementary and high school life in Kragujevac and entered the Military Academy on September 1, 1887, within the 20th Class.

Early military career
He was promoted to Lieutenant of Artillery on September 14, 1890, and in 1896, he married Ruska Bajloni who was from a family of industrialists of Czech origin. Živanović also had close ties with the conspirators of the May Coup as he was Captain at the time of the plot. In 1905, together with other officers of engineering and artillery, published the military magazine "ARTILLERY-ENGINEERING GAZETTE A LETTER FOR OFFICERS OF ALL TYPES OF WEAPONS AND PROFESSIONS" and was then made a member of the General Staff on May 20, 1905. From 1907 to 1912, he began teaching general staff training at the Military Academy.

Influence in Sokol
Around this time, he was also a member of a society known as the "Beogradski soko". Colonel Milutin Mišković proposed to unite all Serbian knightly associations. The proposition became initially successful as the "Union of Serbian Knights" was founded on February 21, 1909, which was led by the President of the Board of Directors, Emerich Steinlechner. After two months of serving as president, he stepped down in favor of Colonel Mišković. Despite the founding of the Society, not all chivalric societies joined the Union which resulted in Mišković sending out invitations and appeals to the conference in Kragujevac on October 25 and 26, 1909. Due to the Bosnian Crisis, the "Dušan Silni" and "Association of Serbian Sokols" united on November 8, 1909.

On 1908, the heir to the throne Đorđe Karađorđević worked on the unification of the two Sokol societies. All organizations would then unify on February 2, 1910, when the board of directors elected President Stevan Todorović and Vice President Živanović.

Balkan Wars and World War I
By the time the First Balkan War and the Second Balkan War broke out, he served as the Chief of Staff of the Second Army and was promoted to Colonel in January 1913. During World War I, he commanded the Timočki Division which stood out during the Battle of Kolubara near Lazarevac from November 16 to 18, 1914. He would then command the regiment during the battles against the Austro-Hungarian 7th Division which took Kosmaj in a counterattack and pursued parts of the 5th Army towards Belgrade on December 8.

During the fronts in Corfu and Thessaloniki, he was the chief of staff of the 2nd Army and then the commander of the Yugoslav Division. Upon his retirement in 1918, he gave a speech about the experiences he had throughout World War I and his personal feelings about the regiment. He concluded the speech with:

He was also a recipient Order of Karađorđe's Star with swords.

References

Bibliography
 
  

1870 births
1932 deaths
Military personnel from Kragujevac
People from the Principality of Serbia
People from the Kingdom of Serbia
Serbian military personnel of the Balkan Wars
Serbian military personnel of World War I
Serbian generals
Yugoslav generals